Eugene Nalimov (born Евгений Викторович Нали́мов (Yevgeny Viktorovich Nalimov) in 1965 in Novosibirsk, U.S.S.R.) is a chess programmer and former Microsoft employee, currently working for Context Relevant.

Starting in 1998, he wrote a tablebase generator which included many different endgames. He received a ChessBase award at the ChessBase meeting in Maastricht in 2002 for his work.

Nalimov has an M.Sc. from Novosibirsk State University. He started a Ph.D. dissertation, but did not finish it.

See also 
 Nalimov tablebase

References

External links 
ChessBase: Events (2002) - Eugene Nalimov: Winner of the ChessBase Award and Guest of Honor in Maastricht 
Evcomp - Endgame databases

Computer programmers
Microsoft employees
1965 births
Living people
Computer chess people
Chess endgames
Russian emigrants to the United States
Novosibirsk State University alumni